This is a list of power stations in Spain.

Hydroelectric

Nuclear

Solar

Wind

Fossil fuels

See also 

Energy policy of the European Union
 List of power stations in Europe
 List of largest power stations in the world
 Electricity Network of the Balearic Islands

References 

Spain
 List
Lists of buildings and structures in Spain